Şonacola (also, Şonayçola, Shona-Chola, and Shonadzhola) is a village and municipality in the Lerik Rayon of Azerbaijan. It has a population of 552. The municipality consists of the villages of Şonacola, Qosələr, Divağac, and Hovari.

References 

Populated places in Lerik District